Ceratitella tomentosa is a species of tephritid or fruit flies in the genus Ceratitella of the family Tephritidae.

References

tomentosa